I giorni più belli ( The Best Days or The Most Beautiful Days) is a 1956 Italian comedy film directed by Mario Mattoli and starring Franco Interlenghi.

Cast
 Franco Interlenghi
 Vittorio De Sica
 Mario Carotenuto
 Valeria Moriconi
 Mario Riva
 Riccardo Billi
 Andrea Checchi
 Carlo Campanini
 Carlo Ninchi
 Nando Bruno
 Clelia Matania

References

External links

1956 films
1956 comedy films
Italian comedy films
1950s Italian-language films
Italian black-and-white films
Films directed by Mario Mattoli
1950s Italian films